The men's 50m butterfly S7 event at the 2012 Summer Paralympics took place at the London Aquatics Centre on 31 August. There were two heats; the swimmers with the eight fastest times advanced to the final.

Results

Heats
Competed from 10:01.

Heat 1

Heat 2

Final
Competed at 17:52.

 
'Q = qualified for final. WR = World Record. AM = Americas Record. EU = European Record. OC = Oceania Record.  DSQ = Disqualified.

References
Official London 2012 Paralympics Results: Heats 
Official London 2012 Paralympics Results: Final 

Swimming at the 2012 Summer Paralympics